Platysaurus broadleyi, also known commonly as the Augrabies flat lizard and Broadley's flat lizard, is a species of lizard in the family Cordylidae. The species is endemic to South Africa.

Etymology
Both the specific name, broadleyi, and one of the common names, Broadley's flat lizard, are in honor of African herpetologist Donald George Broadley.

Geographic range
The Augrabies flat lizard has its geographic range between Augrabies Falls and Pella, Northern Cape in South Africa. This area includes the lower Orange River, Northern Cape Province, and Gordonia District.

Habitat

Description

P. broadleyi females and juveniles have a dark brown back, with three thick, cream stripes on the back. These stripes may be broken up into spots, or have spots in between the stripes. The belly is white, sometimes with a black dot on it, and at the rear there is an orange color. The tail is straw-colored. 
Adult males have a bluish head and a greenish back. A darker area in the middle and the vestiges of the juvenile stripes and spots are also present. The forelimbs are yellow to orange, the throat is dark blue, and the belly is black in the front but becomes orange near the tail. Above the tail, it is a tan color, while below and on the sides, it is orange. All this coloration, while helping to attract females, also has a downside: predators such as kestrels easily spot them. Females, on the other hand, have much more subdued coloration and are less likely to be eaten.
The Augrabies flat lizard is very similar to Platysaurus capensis, or the Cape flat lizard, in scalation, but differs in having finer scalation on top of the forelimbs.

Habits
Augrabies flat lizards are common on the granite walls of Augrabies Falls National Park, where they are exposed to thousands of tourists. In summer, they perform acrobatic leaps to catch black flies on the wing from the swarms that gather near rivers, but they will also eat ripe berries of Namaqua figs. Augrabies flat lizards will follow bird flocks to find these fruit-laden trees. One major predator of this lizard is the rock kestrel. Research indicates that the higher the UV levels on a male's throat, the more dominant it is and is less likely to be challenged.
These flat lizards have been discovered to have a much higher visual sensitivity to UV light than other lizards species, allowing males to accurately distinguish between conspecifics of various fitness. They have as many as three times the number of UV photoreceptor cells in their retina compared to other lizards.

Breeding
Sexual maturity in P. broadleyi is reached at around  snout-vent length for both sexes. Females lay two clutches of eggs in early summer. Males demonstrate a preference for larger female mates, most likely due to the positive correlation between the size of a female and the eggs she produces.

See also
Platysaurus

References

Further reading
Baxter-Gilbert J, Parsons J, Bostock C, Riley JL (2019). "Hamerkop (Scopus umbretta) predation on an Augrabies flat lizard (Platysaurus broadleyi)". Herpetological Bulletin 148: 37–38. 
Branch WR, Whiting MJ (1997). "A new Platysaurus (Squamata: Cordylidae) from the Northern Cape Province, South Africa". African Journal of Herpetology 46 (2): 124-136. (Platysaurus broadleyi, new species).
Greeff, Whiting MJ (1999). "Dispersal of Namaqua Fig (Ficus cordata cordata) Seeds by the Augrabies Flat Lizard (Platysaurus broadleyi)". Journal of Herpetology 33' (2): 328–330.

External links

More information
Broadley's flat lizard at Aughrabies

Platysaurus
Endemic reptiles of South Africa
Lizards of Africa
Reptiles described in 1997
Taxa named by William Roy Branch